"Denver Air Route Traffic Control Center (ZDV), (radio communications, "Denver Center") is one of 22 US  Area Control Centers. It is located at 2211 17th Ave, Longmont, Colorado, United States.

The primary responsibility of Denver Center is sequencing and separation of over-flights, arrivals, and departures in order to provide safe, orderly, and expeditious flow of aircraft filed under instrument flight rules (IFR).

Denver Center is the 14th busiest ARTCC in the United States. Between January 1, 2017 and December 31, 2017, Denver Center handled 1,828,575 aircraft. Denver Center covers approximately 285,000 square miles of the Western United States, including all or parts of Colorado, Arizona, New Mexico, Utah, Kansas, Nebraska, South Dakota, Wyoming, and Montana. 

Denver Center lies adjacent to 5 different Air Route Traffic Control Centers, including Minneapolis Air Route Traffic Control Center, Kansas City Air Route Traffic Control Center, Albuquerque Air Route Traffic Control Center, Los Angeles Air Route Traffic Control Center, and Salt Lake City Air Route Traffic Control Center. ZDV overlies or abuts several approach control facilities (including Denver, Aspen, Colorado Springs, Pueblo, Grand Junction, Casper, Cheyenne, and Ellsworth AFB in Rapid City).

References

External links
Denver Center Weather Service Unit (CWSU) (NWS/FAA)

Air traffic control centers
Air traffic control in the United States
Aviation in Colorado